Lebia pulchella, the beautiful banded lebium, is a species of beetle in the family Carabidae. It is found from southern Canada to southern Texas.

References

Further reading

 
 

Lebia
Beetles described in 1826
Taxa named by Pierre François Marie Auguste Dejean